Artyom Antropov (born ) is a Kazakh weightlifter, and Youth World Champion competing in the 96 kg and 102 kg categories. He won the gold medal in the 2017 Youth World Weightlifting Championships in the 85 kg event. He competed at the 2020 Asian Weightlifting Championships in the 102 kg category, and won a bronze medal in the total.

He won the bronze medal in his event at the 2022 Asian Weightlifting Championships held in Manama, Bahrain.

References

Living people
2000 births
21st-century Kazakhstani people
Kazakhstani male weightlifters